Bogdan Bobrov (born 16 September 1997) is a Russian tennis player.

Bobrov has a career high ATP singles ranking of 419 achieved on 27 February 2023. He also has a career high doubles ranking of 431 achieved on 8 November 2021.

Bobrov has won 1 ATP Challenger doubles title at the 2023 Kiskút Open with Sergey Fomin.

References

External links
 
 

1997 births
Living people
Russian male tennis players
Sportspeople from Penza